Inspector Morse is a British television crime drama, starring John Thaw and Kevin Whately, for which eight series were broadcast between 1987 and 2000, totalling thirty-three episodes. Although the last five episodes were each broadcast a year apart (two years before the final episode), when released on DVD, they were billed as Series Eight.

Series overview

Episodes

Series 1 (1987)

Series 2 (1987–88)

Series 3 (1989)

Series 4 (1990)

Series 5 (1991)

Series 6 (1992)

Series 7 (1993)

Series 8 (1995–2000)

See also
 List of Lewis episodes (2006–2015)
 List of Endeavour episodes (2012–2023)

Notes

References

External links

Lists of British drama television series episodes
Lists of British crime television series episodes
List of episodes